Lamberto Boranga (born 30 October 1942 in Foligno) is an Italian high, long and triple jumper (masters athletics), and football goalkeeper.

Biography
He has 112 appearances in Italian Serie A (Association football first division) with ACF Fiorentina (6 in season 1966–67), Brescia Calcio (in season 1969–70) and A.C. Cesena (92 in four seasons from 1973 to 1977). He currently plays football in the lower divisions; according to his contract with Papiano, he will play up to 2015, when he will be 73 years old.

In 2012 he set the world record master in triple jump, with a distance of 10.75, in the M70 category. He is also the holder of the world record M65 in the long jump (5.47 m).

World records
 Triple jump M70: 10.75 m ( Serravalle, 3 November 2012)
 Long jump M65: 5.47 m ( Ljubljana, 27 July 2008)

Achievements
He won ten medals in eleven events at the International Championships (World and European).

See also
List of world records in masters athletics

References

External links
 Lamberto Boranga at MastersAthletics.net
 
 Lamberto Boranga at FIDAL 

1942 births
Living people
Association football goalkeepers
Serie A players
Italian masters athletes
World record holders in masters athletics
A.C. Perugia Calcio players
ACF Fiorentina players
A.C. Reggiana 1919 players
Brescia Calcio players
A.C. Cesena players
S.S.D. Varese Calcio
Parma Calcio 1913 players
A.S.D. Città di Foligno 1928 players
Italian footballers